Colonialism is a practice or policy of control by one people or power over other people or areas, often by establishing colonies and generally with the aim of economic dominance. In the process of colonisation, colonisers may impose their religion, language, economics, and other cultural practices. The foreign administrators rule the territory in pursuit of their interests, seeking to benefit from the colonised region's people and resources. It is associated with but distinct from imperialism.

Though colonialism has existed since ancient times, the concept is most strongly associated with the European colonial period starting with the 15th century when some European states established colonising empires.

At first, European colonising countries followed policies of mercantilism, aiming to strengthen the home-country economy, so agreements usually restricted the colony to trading only with the metropole (mother country). By the mid-19th century, the British Empire gave up mercantilism and trade restrictions and adopted the principle of free trade, with few restrictions or tariffs.

Christian missionaries were active in practically all of the European-controlled colonies because the metropoles were Christian.

Historian Philip Hoffman calculated that by 1800, before the Industrial Revolution, Europeans already controlled at least 35% of the globe, and by 1914, they had gained control of 84% of the globe. In the aftermath of World War II colonial powers retreated between 1945 and 1975; over which time nearly all colonies gained independence, entering into changed colonial, so-called postcolonial and neocolonialist relations.

Postcolonialism and neocolonialism have continued or shifted relations and ideologies of colonialism, justifying its continuation with concepts such as development and new frontiers, as in exploring outer space for colonization.

Definitions

Collins English Dictionary defines colonialism as "the practice by which a powerful country directly controls less powerful countries and uses their resources to increase its own power and wealth". Webster's Encyclopedic Dictionary defines colonialism as "the system or policy of a nation seeking to extend or retain its authority over other people or territories". The Merriam-Webster Dictionary offers four definitions, including "something characteristic of a colony" and "control by one power over a dependent area or people". Etymologically, the word "colony" comes from the Latin colōnia—"a place for agriculture".

The Stanford Encyclopedia of Philosophy uses the term "to describe the process of European settlement and political control over the rest of the world, including the Americas, Australia, and parts of Africa and Asia". It discusses the distinction between colonialism, imperialism and conquest and states that "[t]he difficulty of defining colonialism stems from the fact that the term is often used as a synonym for imperialism. Both colonialism and imperialism were forms of conquest that were expected to benefit Europe economically and strategically," and continues "given the difficulty of consistently distinguishing between the two terms, this entry will use colonialism broadly to refer to the project of European political domination from the sixteenth to the twentieth centuries that ended with the national liberation movements of the 1960s".

In his preface to Jürgen Osterhammel's Colonialism: A Theoretical Overview, Roger Tignor says "For Osterhammel, the essence of colonialism is the existence of colonies, which are by definition governed differently from other territories such as protectorates or informal spheres of influence." In the book, Osterhammel asks, "How can 'colonialism' be defined independently from 'colony?'" He settles on a three-sentence definition:

Types

The Times once quipped that there were three types of colonial empire: "The English, which consists in making colonies with colonists; the German, which collects colonists without colonies; the French, which sets up colonies without colonists." Modern studies of colonialism have often distinguished between various overlapping categories of colonialism, broadly classified into four types: settler colonialism, exploitation colonialism, surrogate colonialism, and internal colonialism. Some historians have identified other forms of colonialism, including national and trade forms.
 Settler colonialism involves large-scale immigration by settlers to colonies, often motivated by religious, political, or economic reasons. This form of colonialism aims largely to supplant prior existing populations with a settler one, and involves large number of settlers emigrating to colonies for the purpose of settling down and establishing settlements. Argentina, Australia, Brazil, Canada, Chile, New Zealand, Russia, South Africa, United States, Uruguay, (and to a more controversial extent Israel) are examples of nations created or expanded in their contemporary form by settler colonization.
 Exploitation colonialism involves fewer colonists and focuses on the exploitation of natural resources or labour to the benefit of the metropole. This form consists of trading posts as well as larger colonies where colonists would constitute much of the political and economic administration. The European colonization of Africa and Asia was largely conducted under the auspices of exploitation colonialism.
 Surrogate colonialism involves a settlement project supported by a colonial power, in which most of the settlers do not come from the same ethnic group as the ruling power.
 Internal colonialism is a notion of uneven structural power between areas of a state. The source of exploitation comes from within the state. This is demonstrated in the way control and exploitation may pass from people from the colonizing country to an immigrant population within a newly independent country.
 National colonialism is a process involving elements of both settler and internal colonialism, in which nation-building and colonization are symbiotically connected, with the colonial regime seeking to remake the colonized peoples into their own cultural and political image. The goal is to integrate them into the state, but only as reflections of the state's preferred culture. The Republic of China in Taiwan is the archetypal example of a national-colonialist society.
 Trade colonialism involves the undertaking of colonialist ventures in support of trade opportunities for merchants. This form of colonialism was most prominent in 19th-century Asia, where previously isolationist states were forced to open their ports to Western powers. Examples of this include the Opium Wars and the opening of Japan.

Socio-cultural evolution
As colonialism often played out in pre-populated areas, sociocultural evolution included the formation of various ethnically hybrid populations. Colonialism gave rise to culturally and ethnically mixed populations such as the mestizos of the Americas, as well as racially divided populations such as those found in French Algeria or in Southern Rhodesia. In fact, everywhere where colonial powers established a consistent and continued presence, hybrid communities existed.

Notable examples in Asia include the Anglo-Burmese, Anglo-Indian, Burgher, Eurasian Singaporean, Filipino mestizo, Kristang, and Macanese peoples. In the Dutch East Indies (later Indonesia) the vast majority of "Dutch" settlers were in fact Eurasians known as Indo-Europeans, formally belonging to the European legal class in the colony (see also Indos in pre-colonial history and Indos in colonial history).

History

Antiquity
Activity that could be called colonialism has a long history, starting at least as early as the ancient Egyptians. Phoenicians, Greeks, and Romans founded colonies in antiquity. Phoenicia had an enterprising maritime trading-culture that spread across the Mediterranean from 1550 BC to 300 BC; later the Persian Empire and various Greek city-states continued on this line of setting up colonies. The Romans would soon follow, setting up coloniae throughout the Mediterranean, in North Africa, and in Western Asia. Beginning in the 7th century, Arabs colonized a substantial portion of the Middle East, North Africa, and parts of Asia and Europe. From the 9th century Vikings (Norsemen) established colonies in Britain, Ireland, Iceland, Greenland, North America, present-day Russia and Ukraine, France (Normandy) and Sicily. In the 9th century a new wave of Mediterranean colonisation began, with competitors such as the Venetians, Genovese and Amalfians infiltrating the wealthy previously Byzantine or Eastern Roman islands and lands. European Crusaders set up colonial regimes in Outremer (in the Levant, 1097–1291) and in the Baltic littoral (12th century onwards). Venice began to dominate Dalmatia and reached its greatest nominal colonial extent at the conclusion of the Fourth Crusade in 1204, with the declaration of the acquisition of three octaves of the Byzantine Empire.

Modernity

More than a century before the Jamestown, Virginia settlement led by captain Christopher Newport, modern colonialism started with the Portuguese Prince Henry the Navigator (1394–1460), initiating the Age of Discovery and establishing African trading posts (1445 onwards). Spain (initially the Crown of Castile) and soon after Portugal encountered the Americas (1492 onwards) through sea travel and built trading posts or conquered large extents of land. For some people, it is this building of colonies across oceans that differentiates colonialism from other types of expansionism. Madrid and Lisbon divided the areas of these "new" lands between the Spanish and Portuguese Empires in 1494; other would-be colonial powers paid little heed to the theoretical demarcation.

The 17th century saw the birth of the Dutch and French colonial empires, as well as the English overseas possessions, which later became the British Empire. It also saw the establishment of some Danish and Swedish overseas colonies.

A first wave of independence movements started with the American Revolutionary War (1775–1783), initiating a new phase for the British Empire. The Spanish Empire largely collapsed in the Americas with the Spanish American wars of independence ( onwards). Empire-builders established several new colonies after this time, including in the German and Belgian colonial empires. In the late 19th century, many European powers became involved in the Scramble for Africa.

The Austrian, Russian, and Ottoman Empires existed at the same time as the above empires but did not expand over oceans. Rather, these empires expanded through the more traditional route of the conquest of neighbouring territories. There was, though, some Russian colonisation of North America across the Bering Strait. From the 1860s, the Empire of Japan modelled itself on European colonial empires and expanded its territories in the Pacific and on the Asian mainland. Argentina and the Empire of Brazil fought for hegemony in South America. The United States gained overseas territories after the 1898 Spanish–American War, hence, the coining of the term "American Empire".

20th century

The world's colonial population at the outbreak of the First World War (1914) – a high point for colonialism – totalled about 560 million people, of whom 70% lived in British possessions, 10% in French possessions, 9% in Dutch possessions, 4% in Japanese possessions, 2% in German possessions, 2% in American possessions, 3% in Portuguese possessions, 1% in Belgian possessions and 0.5% in Italian possessions. The domestic domains of the colonial powers had a total population of about 370 million people. Outside Europe, few areas had remained without coming under formal colonial tutorship – and even Siam, China, Japan, Nepal, Afghanistan, Persia, and Abyssinia had felt varying degrees of Western colonial-style influence – concessions, unequal treaties, extraterritoriality and the like.

Asking whether colonies paid, economic historian Grover Clark (1891–1938) argues an emphatic "No!" He reports that in every case the support cost, especially the military system necessary to support and defend colonies, outran the total trade they produced. Apart from the British Empire, they did not provide favoured destinations for the immigration of surplus metropole populations. The question of whether colonies paid is a complicated one when recognizing the multiplicity of interests involved. In some cases colonial powers paid a lot in military costs while private investors pocketed the benefits. In other cases the colonial powers managed to move the burden of administrative costs to the colonies themselves by imposing taxes.

After World War I (1914–1918), the victorious Allies divided up the German colonial empire and much of the Ottoman Empire between themselves as League of Nations mandates, grouping these territories into three classes according to how quickly it was deemed that they could prepare for independence. The empires of Russia and Austria collapsed in 1917–1918. Nazi Germany set up short-lived colonial systems (Reichskommissariate, Generalgouvernement) in Eastern Europe in the early 1940s.

After World War II (1939–1945), decolonisation progressed rapidly, due to a number of reasons. First, the Japanese victories in the Pacific War of 1941–1945 had showed Indians and other subject peoples that the colonial powers were not invincible. Second, World War II had significantly weakened all the overseas colonial powers economically.

The word "neocolonialism" originated from Jean-Paul Sartre in 1956, to refer to a variety of contexts since the decolonisation that took place after World War II. Generally it does not refer to a type of direct colonisation – rather to colonialism or colonial-style exploitation by other means. Specifically, neocolonialism may refer to the theory that former or existing economic relationships, such as the General Agreement on Tariffs and Trade and the Central American Free Trade Agreement, or the operations of companies (such as Royal Dutch Shell in Nigeria and Brunei) fostered by former colonial powers were or are used to maintain control of former colonies and dependencies after the colonial independence movements of the post–World War II period.

The term "neocolonialism" became popular in ex-colonies in the late 20th century.

List of colonies

British 

 Aden
 Afghanistan
 America
 Anglo-Egyptian Sudan
 Ascension Island
 Australia
 New South Wales
 Victoria
 Tasmania
 Queensland
 South Australia
 Western Australia
 Bahamas
 Barbados
 Basutoland
 Bechuanaland
 British Borneo
 Brunei
 Labuan
 North Borneo
 Sarawak
 British East Africa
 British Guiana
 British Honduras
 British Hong Kong
 British Leeward Islands
 Anguilla
 Antigua
 Barbuda
 British Virgin Islands
 Dominica
 Montserrat
 Nevis 
 Saint Kitts
 British Malaya 
 Federated Malay States
 Straits Settlements
 Unfederated Malay States
 British Somaliland
 British Western Pacific Territories
 British Solomon Islands
 Fiji
 Gilbert and Ellice Islands
 Phoenix Islands
 Pitcairn Islands
 New Hebrides (condominium with France)
 Tonga
 Union Islands
 British Windward Islands
 Barbados
 Dominica
 Grenada
 Saint Lucia
 Saint Vincent and the Grenadines
 Myanmar
 Canada
 Ceylon
 Christmas Island
 Cocos (Keeling) Islands
 Cyprus (including Akrotiri and Dhekelia)
 Egypt
 Falkland Islands
 Falkland Islands Dependencies
 Graham Land
 South Georgia
 South Orkney Islands
 South Shetland Islands
 South Sandwich Islands
 Victoria Land
 Gambia
 Gibraltar
 Gold Coast
 India (including what is today Pakistan, Bangladesh, and Myanmar) 
 Heard Island and McDonald Islands
 Ireland
 Jamaica
 Kenya
 Maldives
 Malta
 Mandatory Palestine
 Emirate of Transjordan
 Mandatory Iraq
 Mauritius
 Muscat and Oman
 Norfolk Island
 Nigeria
 Northern Rhodesia
 Nyasaland 
 Seychelles
 Sierra Leone
 Shanghai International Settlement
 South Africa
 Cape Colony
 Natal
 Transvaal Colony
 Orange River Colony
 Southern Rhodesia
 St Helena
 Swaziland
 Trinidad and Tobago
 Tristan da Cunha
 Trucial States
 Uganda
 Tonga

French 

 Acadia
 Algeria
 Canada
 Clipperton Island
 Comoros Islands (including Mayotte)
 French Guiana
 French Equatorial Africa
 Chad
 Oubangui-Chari
 French Congo
 Gabon
 French India (Pondichéry, Chandernagor, Karikal, Mahé and Yanaon)
 French Indochina
Annam 
 Tonkin
 Cochinchina
 Cambodia
 Laos
 French Polynesia
 French Somaliland
 French Southern and Antarctic Lands
 French West Africa
 Ivory Coast
 Dahomey
 Guinea 
 French Sudan
 Mauritania
 Niger
 Senegal
 Upper Volta
 Guadeloupe
 Saint Barthélemy
 Saint Martin
 La Réunion
 Louisiana
 Madagascar
 Martinique
 French Morocco
 French Mandate for Syria and Lebanon
 New Caledonia
 Saint-Pierre-et-Miquelon
 Saint-Domingue
 Shanghai French Concession (similar concessions in Kouang-Tchéou-Wan, Tientsin, Hankéou)
 Tunisia
 New Hebrides (condominium with Britain)
 Wallis-et-Futuna

American

 American Concession in Tianjin (1869–1902)
 American Concession in Shanghai (1848–1863)
 American Concession in Beihai (1876–1943)
 American Concession in Harbin (1898–1943)
 American Samoa
 Beijing Legation Quarter (1861–1945)
 Corn Islands (1914–1971)
 Canton and Enderbury Islands
 Caroline Islands
 Cuba (Platt Amendment turned Cuba into a protectorate – until Cuban Revolution)
 Falkland Islands (1832)
 Guantánamo Bay
 Guam
 Gulangyu Island (1903–1945)
 Haiti (1915–1934)
 Indian Territory (1834–1907)
 Isle of Pines (1899–1925)
 Liberia (Independent since 1847, US protectorate until post-WW2)
 Marshall Islands 
 Midway
 Nicaragua (1912–1933)
 Northern Mariana Islands 
 Palau 
 Palmyra Atoll
 Panama (Hay–Bunau-Varilla Treaty turned Panama into a protectorate, protectorate until post-WW2)
 Panama Canal Zone (1903–1979)
 Philippines (1898–1946)
 Puerto Rico
 Quita Sueño Bank (1869–1981)
 Roncador Bank (1856–1981)
 Ryukyu Islands (1945–1972)  
 Shanghai International Settlement (1863–1945)
 Sultanate of Sulu (1903–1915)
 Swan Islands, Honduras (1914–1972)
 Treaty Ports of China, Korea and Japan
 United States Virgin Islands
 Wake Island
 Wilkes Land

Russian 

 Emirate of Bukhara (1873–1917)
 Grand Duchy of Finland (1809–1917)
 Khiva Khanate (1873–1917)
 Kauai (Hawaii) (1816–1817)
 Russian America (Alaska) (1733–1867)
 Fort Ross (California)
 Russian Dalian (1898-1905)

German 

 Bismarck Archipelago
 Kamerun
 Caroline Islands
 German New Guinea
 German Samoa
 German Solomon Islands
 German East Africa
 German South-West Africa
 Gilbert Islands
 Jiaozhou Bay
 Mariana Islands
 Marshall Islands
 Nauru
 Palau
 Togoland
 Tianjin

Italian 

 Italian Aegean Islands
 Italian Albania (1918–1920)
 Italian Albania (1939–1943)
 Italian concession of Tientsin
 Italian governorate of Dalmatia
 Italian governorate of Montenegro
 Hellenic State
 Italian Eritrea
 Italian Somaliland
 Italian Trans-Juba (briefly; annexed)  
 Libya
 Italian Tripolitania
 Italian Cyrenaica
 Italian Libya
 Italian East Africa
 Italian occupation of Majorca (1936-1939)

Dutch 

 Dutch Brazil
 Dutch Ceylon
 Dutch Formosa
 Dutch Cape Colony
 Aruba
 Bonaire
 Curaçao
 Saba
 Sint Eustatius
 Sint Maarten
 Surinam (Dutch colony)
 Dutch East Indies
 Dutch New Guinea

Portuguese 

 Portuguese Africa
 Cabinda
 Ceuta
 Madeira
 Portuguese Angola
 Portuguese Cape Verde
 Portuguese Guinea
 Portuguese Mozambique
 Portuguese São Tomé and Príncipe
 Fort of São João Baptista de Ajudá
 Portuguese Asia
 Portuguese Ceylon
 Portuguese India
 Goa
 Daman
 Diu
 Portuguese Macau
 Portuguese Oceania
 Flores
 Portuguese Timor
 Solor
 Portuguese South America
 Colonial Brazil
 Cisplatina
 Misiones Orientales
 Portuguese North America
 Azores
 Newfoundland and Labrador

Spanish 

 Canary Islands
 Cape Juby
 Captaincy General of Cuba
 Spanish Florida
 Spanish Louisiana
 Captaincy General of the Philippines
 Caroline Islands
 Mariana Islands
 Marshall Islands
 Palau Islands
 Ifni
 Río de Oro
 Saguia el-Hamra
 Spanish Morocco
 Spanish Netherlands
 Spanish Sahara
 Spanish Sardinia
 Spanish Sicily
 Viceroyalty of Peru
 Captaincy General of Chile
 Viceroyalty of the Río de la Plata
 Spanish Guinea
 Annobón
 Fernando Po
 Río Muni
 Viceroyalty of New Granada
 Captaincy General of Venezuela
 Viceroyalty of New Spain
 Captaincy General of Guatemala
 Captaincy General of Yucatán
 Captaincy General of Santo Domingo
 Captaincy General of Puerto Rico
 Spanish Formosa

Austrian and Austro-Hungarian 

 Bosnia and Herzegovina 1878–1918.
 Tianjin, China, 1902–1917.
 Austrian Netherlands, 1714–1797
 Nicobar Islands, 1778–1783
 North Borneo, 1876–1879

Danish 

 Andaman and Nicobar Islands
 Danish West Indies (now United States Virgin Islands)
 Danish Norway
 Faroe Islands
 Greenland
 Iceland
 Serampore
 Danish Gold Coast
 Danish India

Belgian 
 Belgian Congo
 Ruanda-Urundi
 Tianjin

Swedish 
 Guadeloupe 
 New Sweden 
 Saint Barthélemy 
 Swedish Gold Coast
 Dominions of Sweden in continental Europe

Norwegian 
 Svalbard
 Jan Mayen
 Bouvet Island
 Queen Maud Land
 Peter I Island

Ottoman 
Rumelia
Ottoman North Africa
Ottoman Arabia

Australian 
 Papua New Guinea
 Christmas Island
 Cocos Islands
 Coral Sea Islands
 Heard Island and McDonald Islands
 Norfolk Island
 Nauru
 Australian Antarctic Territory

New Zealand

 Cook Islands
 Nauru
 Niue
 Ross Dependency
 Balleny Islands
 Ross Island
 Scott Island
 Roosevelt Island

Japanese

 Bonin Islands 
 Karafuto
 Korea
 Kuril Islands
 Kwantung Leased Territory
 Nanyo
 Caroline Islands
 Marshall Islands
 Northern Mariana Islands
 Palau Islands
 Penghu Islands
 Ryukyu Domain
 Taiwan
 Volcano Islands

Chinese

 Dzungaria (Xinjiang) from 1758–present
 Kashgaria (East Turkistan) from 1884 – 1933, 1934–1944, 1949–present
 Guangxi (Tusi)
 Hainan
 Nansha Islands
 Xisha Islands
 Manchuria
 Inner Mongolia
 Outer Mongolia (Mongolia & Tuva) during the late Qing dynasty
 Taiwan
 Tibet (Kashag)
 Yunnan (Tusi)
 Vietnam during the Han, Sui, and Tang dynasties

Omani
Omani Empire

 Swahili coast
 Zanzibar
 Qatar
 Bahrain
 Somalia
 Socotra

Mexican
 The Californias
 Texas
 Central America
 Clipperton Island
 Revillagigedo Islands
 Chiapas

Ecuadorian
 Galápagos Islands

Colombian
 Panama
 Ecuador
 Venezuela
 Archipelago of San Andrés, Providencia and Santa Catalina

Argentine

 Protectorate of Peru (1820–1822)
 Gobierno del Cerrito (1843–1851)
 Chile (1817–1818)
 Paraguay (1810–1811, 1873)
 Uruguay (1810–1813)
 Bolivia (1810–1822)
 Tierra del Fuego
 Patagonia
 Falkland Islands and Dependencies  (1829–1831, 1832–1833, 1982)
 Argentine Antarctica
 Misiones
 Formosa
 Puna de Atacama (1839– )
 Argentina expedition to California (1818)
 Equatorial Guinea (1810–1815)

Paraguayan colonies
 Mato Grosso do Sul
 Formosa

Bolivian
 Puna de Atacama (1825–1839 ceded to Argentina) (1825–1879 ceded to Chile)
 Acre

Ethiopian
 Eritrea

Moroccan
 Western Sahara

Indian
 Gilgit Baltistan

Indonesian

 East Timor

Thai/Siamese

 Kingdom of Vientiane (1778–1828)
 Kingdom of Luang Prabang (1778–1893)
 Kingdom of Champasak (1778–1893)
 Kingdom of Cambodia (1771–1867)
 Kedah (1821–1826)
 Perlis (1821–1836)

Ancient Egyptian
 Canaan
 Nubia

Khedivate Egyptian
 Anglo-Egyptian Sudan
 Habesh Eyalet
 Sidon Eyalet
 Damascus Eyalet

Impact

The impacts of colonisation are immense and pervasive. Various effects, both immediate and protracted, include the spread of virulent diseases, unequal social relations, detribalization, exploitation, enslavement, medical advances, the creation of new institutions, abolitionism, improved infrastructure, and technological progress. Colonial practices also spur the spread of colonist languages, literature and cultural institutions, while endangering or obliterating those of native peoples. The native cultures of the colonised peoples can also have a powerful influence on the imperial country.

Economy, trade and commerce
Economic expansion, sometimes described as the colonial surplus, has accompanied imperial expansion since ancient times. Greek trade networks spread throughout the Mediterranean region while Roman trade expanded with the primary goal of directing tribute from the colonised areas towards the Roman metropole. According to Strabo, by the time of emperor Augustus, up to 120 Roman ships would set sail every year from Myos Hormos in Roman Egypt to India. With the development of trade routes under the Ottoman Empire,

Aztec civilisation developed into an extensive empire that, much like the Roman Empire, had the goal of exacting tribute from the conquered colonial areas. For the Aztecs, a significant tribute was the acquisition of sacrificial victims for their religious rituals.

On the other hand, European colonial empires sometimes attempted to channel, restrict and impede trade involving their colonies, funneling activity through the metropole and taxing accordingly.

Despite the general trend of economic expansion, the economic performance of former European colonies varies significantly. In "Institutions as a Fundamental Cause of Long-run Growth", economists Daron Acemoglu, Simon Johnson and James A. Robinson compare the economic influences of the European colonists on different colonies and study what could explain the huge discrepancies in previous European colonies, for example, between West African colonies like Sierra Leone and Hong Kong and Singapore.

According to the paper, economic institutions are the determinant of the colonial success because they determine their financial performance and order for the distribution of resources. At the same time, these institutions are also consequences of political institutions – especially how de facto and de jure political power is allocated. To explain the different colonial cases, we thus need to look first into the political institutions that shaped the economic institutions.

For example, one interesting observation is "the Reversal of Fortune" – the less developed civilisations in 1500, like North America, Australia, and New Zealand, are now much richer than those countries who used to be in the prosperous civilisations in 1500 before the colonists came, like the Mughals in India and the Incas in the Americas. One explanation offered by the paper focuses on the political institutions of the various colonies: it was less likely for European colonists to introduce economic institutions where they could benefit quickly from the extraction of resources in the area. Therefore, given a more developed civilisation and denser population, European colonists would rather keep the existing economic systems than introduce an entirely new system; while in places with little to extract, European colonists would rather establish new economic institutions to protect their interests. Political institutions thus gave rise to different types of economic systems, which determined the colonial economic performance.

European colonisation and development also changed gendered systems of power already in place around the world. In many pre-colonialist areas, women maintained power, prestige, or authority through reproductive or agricultural control. For example, in certain parts of sub-Saharan Africa      women maintained farmland in which they had usage rights. While men would make political and communal decisions for a community, the women would control the village's food supply or their individual family's land. This allowed women to achieve power and autonomy, even in patrilineal and patriarchal societies.

Through the rise of European colonialism came a large push for development and industrialisation of most economic systems. When working to improve productivity, Europeans focused mostly on male workers. Foreign aid arrived in the form of loans, land, credit, and tools to speed up development, but were only allocated to men. In a more European fashion, women were expected to serve on a more domestic level. The result was a technologic, economic, and class-based gender gap that widened over time.

Within a colony, the presence of extractive colonial institutions in a given area has been found have effects on the modern day economic development, institutions and infrastructure of these areas.

Slavery and indentured servitude

European nations entered their imperial projects with the goal of enriching the European metropoles. Exploitation of non-Europeans and of other Europeans to support imperial goals was acceptable to the colonisers. Two outgrowths of this imperial agenda were the extension of slavery and indentured servitude. In the 17th century, nearly two-thirds of English settlers came to North America as indentured servants.

European slave traders brought large numbers of African slaves to the Americas by sail. Spain and Portugal had brought African slaves to work in African colonies such as Cape Verde and São Tomé and Príncipe, and then in Latin America, by the 16th century. The British, French and Dutch joined in the slave trade in subsequent centuries. The European colonial system took approximately 11 million Africans to the Caribbean and to North and South America as slaves.

Abolitionists in Europe and Americas protested the inhumane treatment of African slaves, which led to the elimination of the slave trade (and later, of most forms of slavery) by the late 19th century. One (disputed) school of thought points to the role of abolitionism in the American Revolution: while the British colonial metropole started to move towards outlawing slavery, slave-owning elites in the Thirteen Colonies saw this as one of the reasons to fight for their post-colonial independence and for the right to develop and continue a largely slave-based economy.

British colonising activity in New Zealand from the early 19th century played a part in ending slave-taking and slave-keeping among the indigenous Māori.
On the other hand, British colonial administration in Southern Africa, when it officially abolished slavery in the 1830s, caused rifts in society which arguably perpetuated slavery in the Boer Republics and fed into the philosophy of apartheid.

The labour shortages that resulted from abolition inspired European colonisers in Queensland, British Guaiana and Fiji (for example) to develop new sources of labour, re-adopting a system of indentured servitude. Indentured servants consented to a contract with the European colonisers. Under their contract, the servant would work for an employer for a term of at least a year, while the employer agreed to pay for the servant's voyage to the colony, possibly pay for the return to the country of origin, and pay the employee a wage as well. The employees became "indentured" to the employer because they owed a debt back to the employer for their travel expense to the colony, which they were expected to pay through their wages. In practice, indentured servants were exploited through terrible working conditions and burdensome debts imposed by the employers, with whom the servants had no means of negotiating the debt once they arrived in the colony.

India and China were the largest source of indentured servants during the colonial era. Indentured servants from India travelled to British colonies in Asia, Africa and the Caribbean, and also to French and Portuguese colonies, while Chinese servants travelled to British and Dutch colonies. Between 1830 and 1930, around 30 million indentured servants migrated from India, and 24 million returned to India. China sent more indentured servants to European colonies, and around the same proportion returned to China.

Following the Scramble for Africa, an early but secondary focus for most colonial regimes was the suppression of slavery and the slave trade. By the end of the colonial period they were mostly successful in this aim, though slavery persists in Africa and in the world at large with much the same practices of de facto servility despite legislative prohibition.

Military innovation

Conquering forces have throughout history applied innovation in order to gain an advantage over the armies of the people they aim to conquer. Greeks developed the phalanx system, which enabled their military units to present themselves to their enemies as a wall, with foot soldiers using shields to cover one another during their advance on the battlefield. Under Philip II of Macedon, they were able to organise thousands of soldiers into a formidable battle force, bringing together carefully trained infantry and cavalry regiments. Alexander the Great exploited this military foundation further during his conquests.

The Spanish Empire held a major advantage over Mesoamerican warriors through the use of weapons made of stronger metal, predominantly iron, which was able to shatter the blades of axes used by the Aztec civilisation and others. The use of gunpowder weapons cemented the European military advantage over the peoples they sought to subjugate in the Americas and elsewhere.

End of empire

The populations of some colonial territories, such as Canada, enjoyed relative peace and prosperity as part of a European power, at least among the majority. Minority populations such as First Nations peoples and French-Canadians experienced marginalisation and resented colonial practices. Francophone residents of Quebec, for example, were vocal in opposing conscription into the armed services to fight on behalf of Britain during World War I, resulting in the Conscription crisis of 1917. Other European colonies had much more pronounced conflict between European settlers and the local population. Rebellions broke out in the later decades of the imperial era, such as India's Sepoy Rebellion of 1857.

The territorial boundaries imposed by European colonisers, notably in central Africa and South Asia, defied the existing boundaries of native populations that had previously interacted little with one another. European colonisers disregarded native political and cultural animosities, imposing peace upon people under their military control. Native populations were often relocated at the will of the colonial administrators.

The Partition of British India in August 1947 led to the Independence of India and the creation of Pakistan. These events also caused much bloodshed at the time of the migration of immigrants from the two countries. Muslims from India and Hindus and Sikhs from Pakistan migrated to the respective countries they sought independence for.

Post-independence population movement

In a reversal of the migration patterns experienced during the modern colonial era, post-independence era migration followed a route back towards the imperial country. In some cases, this was a movement of settlers of European origin returning to the land of their birth, or to an ancestral birthplace. 900,000 French colonists (known as the Pied-Noirs) resettled in France following Algeria's independence in 1962. A significant number of these migrants were also of Algerian descent. 800,000 people of Portuguese origin migrated to Portugal after the independence of former colonies in Africa between 1974 and 1979; 300,000 settlers of Dutch origin migrated to the Netherlands from the Dutch West Indies after Dutch military control of the colony ended.

After WWII 300,000 Dutchmen from the Dutch East Indies, of which the majority were people of Eurasian descent called Indo Europeans, repatriated to the Netherlands. A significant number later migrated to the US, Canada, Australia and New Zealand.

Global travel and migration in general developed at an increasingly brisk pace throughout the era of European colonial expansion. Citizens of the former colonies of European countries may have a privileged status in some respects with regard to immigration rights when settling in the former European imperial nation. For example, rights to dual citizenship may be generous, or larger immigrant quotas may be extended to former colonies.

In some cases, the former European imperial nations continue to foster close political and economic ties with former colonies. The Commonwealth of Nations is an organisation that promotes cooperation between and among Britain and its former colonies, the Commonwealth members. A similar organisation exists for former colonies of France, the Francophonie; the Community of Portuguese Language Countries plays a similar role for former Portuguese colonies, and the Dutch Language Union is the equivalent for former colonies of the Netherlands.

Migration from former colonies has proven to be problematic for European countries, where the majority population may express hostility to ethnic minorities who have immigrated from former colonies. Cultural and religious conflict have often erupted in France in recent decades, between immigrants from the Maghreb countries of north Africa and the majority population of France. Nonetheless, immigration has changed the ethnic composition of France; by the 1980s, 25% of the total population of "inner Paris" and 14% of the metropolitan region were of foreign origin, mainly Algerian.

On colonisers

In his 1955 essay, Discourse on Colonialism (French: Discours sur le colonialisme), French poet Aimé Césaire evaluates the effects of racist, sexist, and capitalist attitudes and motivations on the civilisations that attempted to colonise other civilisations. In explaining his position, he says, "I admit that it is a good thing to place different civilisations in contact with each other that it is an excellent thing to blend different worlds; that whatever its own particular genius may be, a civilisation that withdraws into itself atrophies; that for civilisations, exchange is oxygen."

To illustrate his point, he explains that colonisation relies on racist and xenophobic frameworks that dehumanise the targets of colonisation and justify their extreme and brutal mistreatment. Every time an immoral act perpetrated by colonisers onto the colonised is justified by racist, sexist, otherwise xenophobic, or capitalist motivations to subjugate a group of people, the colonising civilisation "acquires another dead weight, a universal regression takes place, a gangrene sets in, a centre of infection begins to spread." Césaire argues the result of this process is that "a poison [is] instilled into the veins of Europe and, slowly but surely, the continent proceeds toward savagery."

Introduced diseases

Encounters between explorers and populations in the rest of the world often introduced new diseases, which sometimes caused local epidemics of extraordinary virulence. For example, smallpox, measles, malaria, yellow fever, and others were unknown in pre-Columbian America.

Half the native population of Hispaniola in 1518 was killed by smallpox. Smallpox also ravaged Mexico in the 1520s, killing 150,000 in Tenochtitlan alone, including the emperor, and Peru in the 1530s, aiding the European conquerors. Measles killed a further two million Mexican natives in the 17th century. In 1618–1619, smallpox wiped out 90% of the Massachusetts Bay Native Americans. Smallpox epidemics in 1780–1782 and 1837–1838 brought devastation and drastic depopulation among the Plains Indians. Some believe that the death of up to 95% of the Native American population of the New World was caused by Old World diseases. Over the centuries, the Europeans had developed high degrees of immunity to these diseases, while the indigenous peoples had no time to build such immunity.

Smallpox decimated the native population of Australia, killing around 50% of indigenous Australians in the early years of British colonisation. It also killed many New Zealand Māori. As late as 1848–49, as many as 40,000 out of 150,000 Hawaiians are estimated to have died of measles, whooping cough and influenza. Introduced diseases, notably smallpox, nearly wiped out the native population of Easter Island. In 1875, measles killed over 40,000 Fijians, approximately one-third of the population. The Ainu population decreased drastically in the 19th century, due in large part
to infectious diseases brought by Japanese settlers pouring into Hokkaido.

Conversely, researchers have hypothesised that a precursor to syphilis may have been carried from the New World to Europe after Columbus's voyages. The findings suggested Europeans could have carried the nonvenereal tropical bacteria home, where the organisms may have mutated into a more deadly form in the different conditions of Europe. The disease was more frequently fatal than it is today; syphilis was a major killer in Europe during the Renaissance. The first cholera pandemic began in Bengal, then spread across India by 1820. Ten thousand British troops and countless Indians died during this pandemic. Between 1736 and 1834 only some 10% of East India Company's officers survived to take the final voyage home. Waldemar Haffkine, who mainly worked in India, who developed and used vaccines against cholera and bubonic plague in the 1890s, is considered the first microbiologist.

According to a 2021 study by Jörg Baten and Laura Maravall on the anthropometric influence of colonialism on Africans, the average height of Africans decreased by 1.1 centimetres upon colonization and later recovered and increased overall during colonial rule. The authors attributed the decrease to diseases, such as malaria and sleeping sickness, forced labor during the early decades of colonial rule, conflicts, land grabbing, and widespread cattle deaths from the rinderpest viral disease.

Countering disease
As early as 1803, the Spanish Crown organised a mission (the Balmis expedition) to transport the smallpox vaccine to the Spanish colonies, and establish mass vaccination programs there. By 1832, the federal government of the United States established a smallpox vaccination program for Native Americans. Under the direction of Mountstuart Elphinstone a program was launched to propagate smallpox vaccination in India. From the beginning of the 20th century onwards, the elimination or control of disease in tropical countries became a driving force for all colonial powers. The sleeping sickness epidemic in Africa was arrested due to mobile teams systematically screening millions of people at risk. In the 20th century, the world saw the biggest increase in its population in human history due to lessening of the mortality rate in many countries due to medical advances. The world population has grown from 1.6 billion in 1900 to over seven billion today.

Botany
Colonial botany refers to the body of works concerning the study, cultivation, marketing and naming of the new plants that were acquired or traded during the age of European colonialism. Notable examples of these plants included sugar, nutmeg, tobacco, cloves, cinnamon, Peruvian bark, peppers and tea. This work was a large part of securing financing for colonial ambitions, supporting European expansion and ensuring the profitability of such endeavors. Vasco de Gama and Christopher Columbus were seeking to establish routes to trade spices, dyes and silk from the Moluccas, India and China by sea that would be independent of the established routes controlled by Venetian and Middle Eastern merchants. Naturalists like Hendrik van Rheede, Georg Eberhard Rumphius, and Jacobus Bontius compiled data about eastern plants on behalf of the Europeans. Though Sweden did not possess an extensive colonial network, botanical research based on Carl Linnaeus identified and developed techniques to grow cinnamon, tea and rice locally as an alternative to costly imports.

Geography

Settlers acted as the link between indigenous populations and the imperial hegemony, thus bridging the geographical, ideological and commercial gap between the colonisers and colonised. While the extent in which geography as an academic study is implicated in colonialism is contentious, geographical tools such as cartography, shipbuilding, navigation, mining and agricultural productivity were instrumental in European colonial expansion. Colonisers' awareness of the Earth's surface and abundance of practical skills provided colonisers with a knowledge that, in turn, created power.

Anne Godlewska and Neil Smith argue that "empire was 'quintessentially a geographical project. Historical geographical theories such as environmental determinism legitimised colonialism by positing the view that some parts of the world were underdeveloped, which created notions of skewed evolution. Geographers such as Ellen Churchill Semple and Ellsworth Huntington put forward the notion that northern climates bred vigour and intelligence as opposed to those indigenous to tropical climates (See The Tropics) viz a viz a combination of environmental determinism and Social Darwinism in their approach.

Political geographers also maintain that colonial behaviour was reinforced by the physical mapping of the world, therefore creating a visual separation between "them" and "us". Geographers are primarily focused on the spaces of colonialism and imperialism; more specifically, the material and symbolic appropriation of space enabling colonialism.

Maps played an extensive role in colonialism, as Bassett would put it "by providing geographical information in a convenient and standardised format, cartographers helped open West Africa to European conquest, commerce, and colonisation". Because the relationship between colonialism and geography was not scientifically objective, cartography was often manipulated during the colonial era. Social norms and values had an effect on the constructing of maps. During colonialism map-makers used rhetoric in their formation of boundaries and in their art. The rhetoric favoured the view of the conquering Europeans; this is evident in the fact that any map created by a non-European was instantly regarded as inaccurate. Furthermore, European cartographers were required to follow a set of rules which led to ethnocentrism; portraying one's own ethnicity in the centre of the map. As J.B. Harley put it, "The steps in making a map – selection, omission, simplification, classification, the creation of hierarchies, and 'symbolisation' – are all inherently rhetorical."

A common practice by the European cartographers of the time was to map unexplored areas as "blank spaces". This influenced the colonial powers as it sparked competition amongst them to explore and colonise these regions. Imperialists aggressively and passionately looked forward to filling these spaces for the glory of their respective countries. The Dictionary of Human Geography notes that cartography was used to empty 'undiscovered' lands of their Indigenous meaning and bring them into spatial existence via the imposition of "Western place-names and borders, [therefore] priming 'virgin' (putatively empty land, 'wilderness') for colonisation (thus sexualising colonial landscapes as domains of male penetration), reconfiguring alien space as absolute, quantifiable and separable (as property)."

David Livingstone stresses "that geography has meant different things at different times and in different places" and that we should keep an open mind in regards to the relationship between geography and colonialism instead of identifying boundaries. Geography as a discipline was not and is not an objective science, Painter and Jeffrey argue, rather it is based on assumptions about the physical world. Comparison of exogeographical representations of ostensibly tropical environments in science fiction art support this conjecture, finding the notion of the tropics to be an artificial collection of ideas and beliefs that are independent of geography.

Versus imperialism

Marxism
Marxism views colonialism as a form of capitalism, enforcing exploitation and social change. Marx thought that working within the global capitalist system, colonialism is closely associated with uneven development. It is an "instrument of wholesale destruction, dependency and systematic exploitation producing distorted economies, socio-psychological disorientation, massive poverty and neocolonial dependency". Colonies are constructed into modes of production. The search for raw materials and the current search for new investment opportunities is a result of inter-capitalist rivalry for capital accumulation. Lenin regarded colonialism as the root cause of imperialism, as imperialism was distinguished by monopoly capitalism via colonialism and as Lyal S. Sunga explains: "Vladimir Lenin advocated forcefully the principle of self-determination of peoples in his "Theses on the Socialist Revolution and the Right of Nations to Self-Determination" as an integral plank in the programme of socialist internationalism" and he quotes Lenin who contended that "The right of nations to self-determination implies exclusively the right to independence in the political sense, the right to free political separation from the oppressor nation. Specifically, this demand for political democracy implies complete freedom to agitate for secession and for a referendum on secession by the seceding nation." Non Russian marxists within the RSFSR and later the USSR, like Sultan Galiev and Vasyl Shakhrai, meanwhile, between 1918 and 1923 and then after 1929, considered the Soviet Regime a renewed version of the Russian imperialism and colonialism.

In his critique of colonialism in Africa, the Guyanese historian and political activist Walter Rodney states:

"The decisiveness of the short period of colonialism and its negative consequences for Africa spring mainly from the fact that Africa lost power. Power is the ultimate determinant in human society, being basic to the relations within any group and between groups. It implies the ability to defend one's interests and if necessary to impose one's will by any means available ... When one society finds itself forced to relinquish power entirely to another society that in itself is a form of underdevelopment ... During the centuries of pre-colonial trade, some control over social political and economic life was retained in Africa, in spite of the disadvantageous commerce with Europeans. That little control over internal matters disappeared under colonialism. Colonialism went much further than trade. It meant a tendency towards direct appropriation by Europeans of the social institutions within Africa. Africans ceased to set indigenous cultural goals and standards, and lost full command of training young members of the society. Those were undoubtedly major steps backwards ... Colonialism was not merely a system of exploitation, but one whose essential purpose was to repatriate the profits to the so-called 'mother country'. From an African view-point, that amounted to consistent expatriation of surplus produced by African labour out of African resources. It meant the development of Europe as part of the same dialectical process in which Africa was underdeveloped. Colonial Africa fell within that part of the international capitalist economy from which surplus was drawn to feed the metropolitan sector. As seen earlier, exploitation of land and labour is essential for human social advance, but only on the assumption that the product is made available within the area where the exploitation takes place."

According to Lenin, the new imperialism emphasised the transition of capitalism from free trade to a stage of monopoly capitalism to finance capital. He states it is, "connected with the intensification of the struggle for the partition of the world". As free trade thrives on exports of commodities, monopoly capitalism thrived on the export of capital amassed by profits from banks and industry. This, to Lenin, was the highest stage of capitalism. He goes on to state that this form of capitalism was doomed for war between the capitalists and the exploited nations with the former inevitably losing. War is stated to be the consequence of imperialism. As a continuation of this thought G.N. Uzoigwe states, "But it is now clear from more serious investigations of African history in this period that imperialism was essentially economic in its fundamental impulses."

Liberalism and capitalism
Classical liberals were generally in abstract opposition to colonialism and imperialism, including Adam Smith, Frédéric Bastiat, Richard Cobden, John Bright, Henry Richard, Herbert Spencer, H.R. Fox Bourne, Edward Morel, Josephine Butler, W.J. Fox and William Ewart Gladstone. Their philosophies found the colonial enterprise, particularly mercantilism, in opposition to the principles of free trade and liberal policies. Adam Smith wrote in The Wealth of Nations that Britain should grant independence to all of its colonies and also argued that it would be economically beneficial for British people in the average, although the merchants having mercantilist privileges would lose out.

Race and gender
During the colonial era, the global process of colonisation served to spread and synthesize the social and political belief systems of the "mother-countries" which often included a belief in a certain natural racial superiority of the race of the mother-country. Colonialism also acted to reinforce these same racial belief systems within the "mother-countries" themselves. Usually also included within the colonial belief systems was a certain belief in the inherent superiority of male over female. This particular belief was often pre-existing amongst the pre-colonial societies, prior to their colonisation.

Popular political practices of the time reinforced colonial rule by legitimising European (and/ or Japanese) male authority, and also legitimising female and non-mother-country race inferiority through studies of craniology, comparative anatomy, and phrenology. Biologists, naturalists, anthropologists, and ethnologists of the 19th century were focused on the study of colonised indigenous women, as in the case of Georges Cuvier's study of Sarah Baartman. Such cases embraced a natural superiority and inferiority relationship between the races based on the observations of naturalists' from the mother-countries. European studies along these lines gave rise to the perception that African women's anatomy, and especially genitalia, resembled those of mandrills, baboons, and monkeys, thus differentiating colonised Africans from what were viewed as the features of the evolutionarily superior, and thus rightfully authoritarian, European woman.

In addition to what would now be viewed as pseudo-scientific studies of race, which tended to reinforce a belief in an inherent mother-country racial superiority, a new supposedly "science-based" ideology concerning gender roles also then emerged as an adjunct to the general body of beliefs of inherent superiority of the colonial era. Female inferiority across all cultures was emerging as an idea supposedly supported by craniology that led scientists to argue that the typical brain size of the female human was, on the average, slightly smaller than that of the male, thus inferring that therefore female humans must be less developed and less evolutionarily advanced than males. This finding of relative cranial size difference was later attributed to the general typical size difference of the human male body versus that of the typical human female body.

Within the former European colonies, non-Europeans and women sometimes faced invasive studies by the colonial powers in the interest of the then prevailing pro-colonial scientific ideology of the day. Such seemingly flawed studies of race and gender coincided with the era of colonialism and the initial introduction of foreign cultures, appearances, and gender roles into the now gradually widening world-views of the scholars of the mother-countries.

Othering

Othering is the process of creating a separate entity to persons or groups who are labelled as different or non-normal due to the repetition of characteristics. Othering is the creation of those who discriminate, to distinguish, label, categorise those who do not fit in the societal norm. Several scholars in recent decades developed the notion of the "other" as an epistemological concept in social theory. For example, postcolonial scholars, believed that colonising powers explained an "other" who were there to dominate, civilise, and extract resources through colonisation of land.

Political geographers explain how colonial/imperial powers "othered" places they wanted to dominate to legalise their exploitation of the land. During and after the rise of colonialism the Western powers perceived the East as the "other", being different and separate from their societal norm. This viewpoint and separation of culture had divided the Eastern and Western culture creating a dominant/subordinate dynamic, both being the "other" towards themselves.

Post-colonialism

Post-colonialism (or post-colonial theory) can refer to a set of theories in philosophy and literature that grapple with the legacy of colonial rule. In this sense, one can regard post-colonial literature as a branch of postmodern literature concerned with the political and cultural independence of peoples formerly subjugated in colonial empires.

Many practitioners take Edward Saïd's book  Orientalism (1978) as the theory's founding work (although French theorists such as Aimé Césaire (1913–2008) and Frantz Fanon (1925–1961) made similar claims decades before Saïd). Saïd analyzed the works of Balzac, Baudelaire and Lautréamont, arguing that they helped to shape a societal fantasy of European racial superiority.

Writers of post-colonial fiction interact with the traditional colonial discourse, but modify or subvert it; for instance by retelling a familiar story from the perspective of an oppressed minor character in the story. Gayatri Chakravorty Spivak's Can the Subaltern Speak? (1998) gave its name to Subaltern Studies.

In A Critique of Postcolonial Reason (1999), Spivak argued that major works of European metaphysics (such as those of  Kant and Hegel) not only tend to exclude the subaltern from their discussions, but actively prevent non-Europeans from occupying positions as fully human subjects. Hegel's Phenomenology of Spirit (1807), famous for its explicit ethnocentrism, considers  Western civilisation as the most accomplished of all, while Kant also had some traces of  racialism in his work.

Colonistics 
The field of colonistics studies colonialism from such viewpoints as those of economics, sociology and psychology.

British public opinion about the British Empire
The 2014 YouGov survey found that British people are mostly proud of colonialism and the British Empire:

Migrations

Nations and regions outside Europe with significant populations of European ancestry

 Africa (see Europeans in Africa)
 South Africa (European South African): 5.8% of the population
 Namibia (European Namibians): 6.5% of the population, of which most are Afrikaans-speaking, in addition to a German-speaking minority.
 Réunion: estimated to be approx. 25% of the population
 Zimbabwe (Europeans in Zimbabwe)
 Algeria (Pied-noir)
 Botswana: 3% of the population
 Kenya (Europeans in Kenya)
 Mauritius (Franco-Mauritian)
 Morocco (European Moroccans)
 Ivory Coast (French people)
 Senegal
 Canary Islands (Spaniards), known as Canarians.
 Seychelles (Franco-Seychellois)
 Somalia (Italian Somalis)
 Eritrea (Italian Eritreans)
 Saint Helena (UK) including Tristan da Cunha (UK): predominantly European.
 Eswatini: 3% of the population
 Tunisia (European Tunisians)

 Asia
 Siberia (Russians, Germans and Ukrainians)
 Kazakhstan (Russians in Kazakhstan, Germans of Kazakhstan): 30% of the population
 Uzbekistan (Russians and other Slavs): 6% of the population
 Kyrgyzstan (Russians and other Slavs): 14% of the population
 Turkmenistan (Russians and other Slavs): 4% of the population
 Tajikistan (Russians and other Slavs): 1% of the population
 Hong Kong
 Philippines (Spanish Ancestry): 3% of the population
 China (Russians in China)
 Indian subcontinent (Anglo-Indians)
 Latin America (see White Latin American) 
Argentina (European Immigration to Argentina): 97% european and mestizo of the population
 Bolivia: 15% of the population
 Brazil (White Brazilian): 47% of the population
 Chile (White Chilean): 60–70% of the population.
 Colombia (White Colombian): 37% of the population
 Costa Rica: 83% of the population
 Cuba (White Cuban): 65% of the population
 Dominican Republic: 16% of the population
 Ecuador: 7% of the population
 Honduras: 1% of the population
 El Salvador: 12% of the population
 Mexico (White Mexican): 9% or ~17% of the population. and 70–80% more as Mestizos.
 Nicaragua: 17% of the population
 Panama: 10% of the population
 Puerto Rico: approx. 80% of the population
 Peru (European Peruvian): 15% of the population
 Paraguay: approx. 20% of the population
 Uruguay (White Uruguayan): 88% of the population
 Venezuela (White Venezuelan): 42% of the population
 Rest of the Americas
Bahamas: 12% of the population
 Barbados (White Barbadian): 4% of the population
 Bermuda: 34% of the population
 Canada (European Canadians): 80% of the population
 Falkland Islands: mostly of British descent.
 French Guiana: 12% of the population
 Greenland: 12% of the population
 Martinique: 5% of the population
 Saint Barthélemy
 Trinidad and Tobago: 1% of the population
 United States (European American): 72% of the population, including Hispanic and Non-Hispanic Whites.
 Oceania (see Europeans in Oceania)
 Australia (European Australians): 90% of the population
 New Zealand (European New Zealanders): 78% of the population
 New Caledonia (Caldoche): 35% of the population
 French Polynesia: (Zoreilles) 10% of the population
 Hawaii: 25% of the population
 Christmas Island: approx. 20% of the population.
 Guam: 7% of the population
 Norfolk Island: 9→5% of the population

Numbers of European settlers in the colonies (1500–1914) 

By 1914, Europeans had migrated to the colonies in the millions. Some intended to remain in the colonies as temporary settlers, mainly as military personnel or on business. Others went to the colonies as immigrants. British people were by far the most numerous population to migrate to the colonies: 2.5 million settled in Canada; 1.5 million in Australia; 750,000 in New Zealand; 450,000 in the Union of South Africa; and 200,000 in India. French citizens also migrated in large numbers, mainly to the colonies in the north African Maghreb region: 1.3 million settled in Algeria; 200,000 in Morocco; 100,000 in Tunisia; while only 20,000 migrated to French Indochina. Dutch and German colonies saw relatively scarce European migration, since Dutch and German colonial expansion focused on commercial goals rather than settlement. Portugal sent 150,000 settlers to Angola, 80,000 to Mozambique, and 20,000 to Goa. During the Spanish Empire, approximately 550,000 Spanish settlers migrated to Latin America.

See also

 African independence movements
 Age of Discovery
 Anti-imperialism
 Chartered company
 Chinese imperialism
 Christianity and colonialism
 Civilising mission
 Colonial Empire
 Colonialism and the Olympic Games
 Coloniality of power
 Colonial war
 Cultural colonialism
 Decoloniality
 Decolonization of the Americas
 Developmentalism
 Direct colonial rule
 Empire of Liberty
 European colonization of Africa
 European colonization of the Americas
 European colonization of Micronesia
 European colonisation of Southeast Asia
 French law on colonialism
 German eastward expansion
 Global Empire
 Historiography of the British Empire
 Impact of Western European colonialism and colonisation
 International relations of the Great Powers (1814–1919)
 Muslim conquests
 Orientalism
 Pluricontinental
 Protectorate
 Satellite state
 Soviet Empire
 Stranger King (Concept)
 Western imperialism in Asia

References

Further reading
 Albertini, Rudolf von. European Colonial Rule, 1880–1940: The Impact of the West on India, Southeast Asia, and Africa (1982) 581 pp
 Benjamin, Thomas, ed. Encyclopedia of Western Colonialism Since 1450 (2006)
 Cooper, Frederick. Colonialism in Question: Theory, Knowledge, History (2005)
 Cotterell, Arthur. Western Power in Asia: Its Slow Rise and Swift Fall, 1415 – 1999 (2009) popular history;  excerpt
 Getz, Trevor R. and Heather Streets-Salter, eds.: Modern Imperialism and Colonialism: A Global Perspective (2010)
 
 LeCour Grandmaison, Olivier: Coloniser, Exterminer – Sur la guerre et l'Etat colonial, Fayard, 2005, 
 Lindqvist, Sven: Exterminate All The Brutes, 1992, New Press; Reprint edition (June 1997), 
 Morris, Richard B. and Graham W. Irwin, eds. Harper Encyclopedia of the Modern World: A Concise Reference History from 1760 to the Present (1970) online
 Ness, Immanuel and Zak Cope, eds. The Palgrave Encyclopedia of Imperialism and Anti-Imperialism (2 vol 2015), 1456 pp
 Nuzzo, Luigi: Colonial Law, European History Online, Mainz: Institute of European History, 2010, retrieved: December 17, 2012.
 Osterhammel, Jürgen: Colonialism: A Theoretical Overview, Princeton, NJ: M. Wiener, 1997.
 Page, Melvin E. et al. eds. Colonialism: An International Social, Cultural, and Political Encyclopedia (3 vol 2003)
 Petringa, Maria, Brazza, A Life for Africa (2006), .
 Prashad, Vijay: The Darker Nations: A People's History of the Third World, The New Press, 2007. ISBN 978-1-56584-785-9
 
 Rönnbäck, K. & Broberg, O. (2019) Capital and Colonialism. The Return on British Investments in Africa 1869–1969 (Palgrave Studies in Economic History)
 Schill, Pierre : Réveiller l'archive d'une guerre coloniale. Photographies et écrits de Gaston Chérau, correspondant de guerre lors du conflit italo-turc pour la Libye (1911–1912), Créaphis, 480 p., 2018. Awaken the archive of a colonial war. Photographs and writings of a French war correspondent during the Italo-Turkish war in Libya (1911–1912). With contributions from art historian Caroline Recher, critic Smaranda Olcèse, writer Mathieu Larnaudie and historian Quentin Deluermoz.
 Stuchtey, Benedikt: Colonialism and Imperialism, 1450–1950, European History Online, Mainz: Institute of European History, 2011, retrieved: July 13, 2011.
 Townsend, Mary Evelyn. European colonial expansion since 1871 (1941).
 U.S. Tariff Commission. Colonial tariff policies (1922), worldwide; 922pp survey online
  Ab Imperio E
 Wendt, Reinhard: European Overseas Rule, European History Online, Mainz: Institute of European History, 2011, retrieved: June 13, 2012.

Primary sources
 Conrad, Joseph, Heart of Darkness, 1899
 Fanon, Frantz, The Wretched of the Earth, Preface by Jean-Paul Sartre. Translated by Constance Farrington. London: Penguin Book, 2001
 Las Casas, Bartolomé de, A Short Account of the Destruction of the Indies (1542, published in 1552).

External links
 
 

 
Cultural geography
International relations theory
Articles containing video clips